Sarcococca hookeriana, the Himalayan sweet box, is a species of flowering plant in the box family Buxaceae, native to China, Afghanistan, North East India, Bhutan and Nepal. It produces aromatic white flowers throughout winter, followed by black berries.

Sarcococca hookeriana has several varieties of very different appearance to which different nomenclature has been applied in the references. Recent convention for example is to use Sarcococca hookeriana var. humilis for the previous Sarcococca humilis, although it has broader, shiny leaves and a different habit than other forms.

This small plant is often used as groundcover in gardens. The variety Sarcococca hookeriana var. digyna is more slender with narrower leaves. The cultivar ‘Purple Stem’ has gained the Royal Horticultural Society's Award of Garden Merit.

Etymology
The Latin specific epithet hookeriana refers to the British botanist and explorer Sir Joseph D. Hooker.

Digyna is derived from Greek and means 'having an ovary with two carpels'.

References

External links

 North Carolina State Extension, North Carolina Extension Gardener Plant Toolbox
 Washington State University, Clark County Extension, Pacific NorthWest (PNW) plants database

hookeriana
Flora of China
Flora of Afghanistan
Flora of Bhutan
Flora of Nepal
Flora of Assam (region)
Taxa named by Henri Ernest Baillon